Hsipaw Township is a township of Kyaukme District in the Shan State of eastern Burma. The main town is Hsipaw.

References

Townships of Shan State